Brian Keith Mitchell (born 16 July 1967) is an English-born Australian politician. He is the member for Lyons in the Australian House of Representatives after winning the seat at the 2016 federal election.

Early life and education
Mitchell was born in Coventry in the United Kingdom, and raised in Perth, Western Australia. He attended Maddington Senior High School and Curtin University, where he obtained a Bachelor of Arts in English, Journalism and Politics in 1989. At university, he worked in various jobs as a kitchenhand, shelf stacker, bartender and fast food manager, was a member of the University Labor Society, and a councillor of the Curtin Student Guild.

Career
Mitchell started his career in print journalism for the Fremantle Herald, where he worked as a journalist from 1989 to 1991, and then as editor from 1994 to 2007. From 1991 to 1992, he worked as publications officer for the ACT Council of Social Service, and then from 1992 to 1994 as adviser to the Federal Labor member for Chifley, Roger Price. After leaving the Fremantle Herald in 2007, he moved to Tasmania and worked as chief of staff for Tasmanian Labor member for Denison Duncan Kerr. He then ran his own public relations and media consultancy firm from 2008 to 2016.

Political career
Mitchell has been a member of the Australian Labor Party since 1988. Before election to parliament, he served as a member of Tasmanian Labor's Administrative Committee and secretary of the Southern Central Policy Branch. He was also secretary of the Lenah Valley Branch from 2009 to 2011, the Richmond Branch from 2011 to 2012, and the Sorell-Tasman Branch from 2012 to 2016.

Mitchell was elected to the House of Representatives at the 2016 federal election, defeating the incumbent Liberal MP Eric Hutchinson in the Division of Lyons.

In December 2017, during the parliamentary eligibility crisis, Mitchell "tried to physically block an ABC cameraman" and reportedly then told reporter Matt Wordsworth to "go and do your research, maggot!". Mitchell says what he said was "go and do your research, Matt" but concedes the audio is indistinct and that Wordsworth genuinely thought he had said the former. Mitchell apologised personally and in the parliament to Wordsworth for what he has described as his "boofheaded intervention". Wordsworth had been attempting to question Justine Keay about her citizenship status.

References

 

1967 births
Living people
Members of the Australian House of Representatives
Members of the Australian House of Representatives for Lyons
Australian Labor Party members of the Parliament of Australia
Labor Left politicians
Politicians from Coventry
English emigrants to Australia
English people of Irish descent
Australian people of Irish descent
21st-century Australian politicians